Cow is a colloquial term for cattle, and the name of female cattle. 

Cow, cows or COW may also refer to:

Science and technology

 Cow, an adult female of several animals
 AT2018cow, a large astronomical explosion also known as "The Cow"
 Distillation cow, a piece of glassware that allows fractions to be collected without breaking vacuum
 Cell on wheels, a means of providing temporary mobile phone network coverage
 Copy-on-write, in computing

Literature
 Al-Baqara, the second and longest sura of the Qur'an, usually translated as "The Cow"
 Cows, a 1998 novel by Matthew Stokoe
 Cow, the English translation of Beat Sterchi's novel Blösch
 "Cows!", a children's story from the Railway Series book Edward the Blue Engine by the Reverend Wilbert Awdry
 "Cows", a poem from The Wiggles' album Big Red Car

Film and television  
 The Cow (1969 film), an Iranian film
 The Cow (1989 film), a Soviet animated short
 Cow (2009 film), a Chinese film
 Cow (2021 film), a British documentary film
 Cow (public service announcement), an anti texting while driving public service announcement
 Cows (TV series), a pilot and cancelled television sitcom produced by Eddie Izzard for Channel 4 in 1997
 Cow, a character in the animated series Cow and Chicken
 Computer Originated World, referring to the globe ID the BBC1 TV network used from 1985 to 1991

Music
 Cows (band), a noise rock band from Minneapolis
 Cow (demo), a 1987 EP by Inspiral Carpets
 "Cows", a song by Grandaddy from their 1992 album Prepare to Bawl

Other uses
 Cerritos On Wheels, municipal bus service operated by the City of Cerritos, California, United States
 College of Wooster, liberal arts college in Wooster, Ohio, United States
 Cow Hell Swamp, Georgia, United States
 Crude oil washing
 Cows (ice cream), a Canadian ice cream brand
 Cowdenbeath railway station, Scotland, National Rail station code
 Cow, part of a cow-calf railroad locomotive set
 COWS, a mnemonic for Cold Opposite, Warm Same in the caloric reflex test

See also
 
 
 Vacas (English: Cows), a 1991 Spanish film
 Kráva (English: The Cow), a 1994 Czech film by Karel Kachyňa
 Sacred cow (disambiguation)
 Cow Run (disambiguation)
 Cowes
 Kow (disambiguation)